IWGB may refer to: 

 Independent Workers' Union of Great Britain
 Industrial Workers of Great Britain